Eric Elliot Wood (born November 22, 1992) is a Canadian professional baseball third baseman who is currently a free agent. He previously played for the Chinatrust Brothers of the Chinese Professional Baseball League (CPBL).

Career
Wood attended Pickering High School in Ajax, Ontario, and Blinn College, in Brenham, Texas. The Oakland Athletics selected Wood in the 37th round of the 2011 Major League Baseball draft, but he did not sign, and returned to Blinn for a second season.

Pittsburgh Pirates
The Pittsburgh Pirates selected Wood in the sixth round, with the 196th overall selection, of the 2012 Major League Baseball draft, and he signed.

After signing, he made his professional debut that same season with the GCL Pirates. After batting .287/.371/.467 with four home runs and 24 RBIs, he was promoted to the State College Spikes at the end of the season. In six games for the Spikes, he batted .200. In 2013, he played for the West Virginia Power where he posted a .255 batting average with six home runs and 51 RBIs in 97 games, and in 2014, he played with the Bradenton Marauders where he slashed .271/.345/.393 with three home runs and 44 RBIs in 113 games. He played for the Altoona Curve in 2015 where he batted .237 with two home runs and 28 RBIs in 101 games, and returned there in 2016, compiling a .249 batting average with 16 home runs and 50 RBIs in 118 games.

The Pirates invited Wood to spring training in 2017. In 2017, he played for the Indianapolis Indians where he batted .238/.311/.438 with 16 home runs and 61 RBIs in 120 games. He began 2018 with the Indians and ended the year as a free agent.

Chinatrust Brothers
On December 29, 2018, Wood signed a contract with the Chinatrust Brothers of the Chinese Professional Baseball League. However, just two games into the season, Wood was released by the Brothers on March 27, 2019.

On March 24, 2019, Wood made his CPBL debut. It was rumored that his release could have resulted from an argument between himself and Brothers manager , who allegedly tried to physically fight Wood following a game on March 26.

Return to Pittsburgh
On March 29, 2019, Wood signed a minor league deal to return to the Pittsburgh Pirates organization. He became a free agent following the 2019 season.

Winnipeg Goldeyes
On March 23, 2020, Wood signed with the Winnipeg Goldeyes of the independent American Association. Wood was released on August 31, 2020.

International career
Wood played for the Canada national baseball team in the 2017 World Baseball Classic, 2019 Pan American Games Qualifier, 2019 Pan American Games and 2019 WBSC Premier12.

References

External links

CPBL

1992 births
Living people
Altoona Curve players
Baseball players from Toronto
Baseball players at the 2019 Pan American Games
Baseball third basemen
Blinn Buccaneers baseball players
Blinn College alumni
Bradenton Marauders players
Canadian expatriate baseball players in Taiwan
Canadian expatriate baseball players in the United States
CTBC Brothers players
Gigantes del Cibao players
Canadian expatriate baseball players in the Dominican Republic
Gulf Coast Pirates players
Indianapolis Indians players
Pan American Games medalists in baseball
Pan American Games silver medalists for Canada
Surprise Saguaros players
State College Spikes players
West Virginia Black Bears players
West Virginia Power players
Winnipeg Goldeyes players
World Baseball Classic players of Canada
2017 World Baseball Classic players
2019 WBSC Premier12 players
Medalists at the 2019 Pan American Games